Nathan Levinson (July 15, 1888 – October 18, 1952) was an American sound engineer. He won an Oscar in the category Sound Recording for the film Yankee Doodle Dandy and was nominated for 16 more in the same category. He was also nominated seven times in the category Best Special Effects.

The Oscar statue that Levinson won for Yankee Doodle Dandy was sold for nearly $90,000 at an auction in Dallas in July 2011.

Selected filmography
Levinson won an Academy Award and was nominated for 16 more in the category Best Sound. He was also nominated seven times for Best Special Effects:

Won
 Yankee Doodle Dandy (1942)

Nominated (Best Sound)
 I Am a Fugitive from a Chain Gang (1932)
 42nd Street (1933)
 Gold Diggers of 1933 (1933)
 Flirtation Walk (1934)
 Captain Blood (1935)
 The Charge of the Light Brigade (1936)
 The Life of Emile Zola (1937)
 Four Daughters (1938)
 The Private Lives of Elizabeth and Essex (1939)
 The Sea Hawk (1940)
 Sergeant York (1941)
 This Is the Army (1943)
 Hollywood Canteen (1944)
 Rhapsody in Blue (1945)
 Johnny Belinda (1948)
 A Streetcar Named Desire (1951)

Nominated (Best Special Effects)
 The Private Lives of Elizabeth and Essex (1939)
 The Sea Hawk (1940)
 The Sea Wolf (1941)
 Desperate Journey (1942)
 Air Force (1943)
 The Adventures of Mark Twain (1944)
 A Stolen Life (1946)

References

External links

1888 births
1952 deaths
Academy Honorary Award recipients
American audio engineers
People from New York City
Best Sound Mixing Academy Award winners
Engineers from New York City
Academy Award for Technical Achievement winners